Jaitwar or Jaitwara railway station is a railway station in Jaitwar town of Madhya Pradesh. Its code is JTW. It serves Jaitwar town. The station consists of three platforms. Passenger, Express and Superfast trains halt here.

References

Railway stations in Satna district
Jabalpur railway division